Myrmecia dichospila is an Australian ant which belongs to the genus Myrmecia. This species is native to Australia and is heavily distributed in South Australia and have some presence in other several states.

Description
Myrmecia dichospila is a small bull ant species. The average length is only 7-9 millimetres, but males are somewhat bigger at 11 millimetres. Mandibles are yellow, and most of the body is completely black. It has similarities to the M. pilosula.

References

Myrmeciinae
Hymenoptera of Australia
Insects described in 1938
Insects of Australia